Nangqian may refer to:

Nangqian County, in Qinghai, China
Nangqian Tibetan Foundation, Tibetan charitable organization